Padej is a village located in Čoka municipality, North Banat District, Vojvodina province, Serbia. As of 2011 census, it has a population of 2,376 inhabitants.

External link 

 History of Padej 

Populated places in Serbian Banat
Čoka